The 1977–78 season was the 63rd season of the Isthmian League, an English football competition.

At the end of the previous season league divisions were renamed: Division One was renamed the Premier Division and Division Two was renamed Division One. Also, seventeen new clubs were newly admitted to the league, they were placed to the new Division Two, as the league expanded to three divisions.

Enfield won Premier Division, whilst Dulwich Hamlet won Division One and Epsom & Ewell won Division Two.

Premier Division

The Premier Division consisted of 22 clubs, including 20 clubs from the previous season and two new clubs, promoted from old Division Two:
Boreham Wood
Carshalton Athletic

League table

Division One

Division One consisted of 22 clubs, including 20 clubs from the previous season and two new clubs, relegated from old Division One:
Dulwich Hamlet
Ilford

League table

Division Two

The 1977–78 season was first for new Division Two. The Division consisted of 16 clubs transferred from the Athenian League and one club (Metropolitan Police) transferred from the Southern Football League Division One South.

League table

References

Isthmian League seasons
I